András Gyürk (born 2 December 1972, Budapest) is a Hungarian politician and Member of the European Parliament (MEP) from Hungary. He is a member of Fidesz, part of the European People's Party.

Gyürk is a substitute for the Committee on Industry, Research and Energy. Gyürk is a member of the
Delegation to the EU-Armenia, EU-Azerbaijan and the EU-Georgia Parliamentary Cooperation Committees, substitute for the Delegation for relations with the Arab Peninsula and the Delegation to the Euronest Parliamentary Assembly.

He is married with two children.

Education
1993 – 1998 Eötvös Loránd University (Budapest), Faculty of Arts (History)
1991 – 1993 College of Finance and Accountancy
1987 – 1991 Franciscan Secondary School (Szentendre)

Political activity
2004 –  Member of the European Parliament
2002 – 2004 Deputy leader, parliamentary faction of Fidesz
2002 – 2004 Vice chairman, Committee on Youth and Sport, Hungarian Parliament
1998 – 1999 Member of the Parliamentary Assembly, Council of Europe (Committee on Migration)
1998 – 2004 Member of the Hungarian Parliament (Committee on Foreign Affairs, Committee on Youth and Sport)
1996 – 2004 Chairman of Fidelitas (Youth organization of Fidesz)
1995 – 2004 Member of the national board of Fidesz
1988 –          Member of Fidesz

Other activities
1995 – 2000 Member of the Pastoral Council, Archdiocese of Esztergom-Budapest
1998 – 2004 Director of Democracy After Communism Foundation

See also
 2004 European Parliament election in Hungary

External links
 
 

1972 births
Living people
Fidesz politicians
Fidesz MEPs
MEPs for Hungary 2004–2009
MEPs for Hungary 2009–2014
Members of the National Assembly of Hungary (1998–2002)
Members of the National Assembly of Hungary (2002–2006)
MEPs for Hungary 2014–2019
MEPs for Hungary 2019–2024